Espelho da Vida is a Brazilian telenovela produced and broadcast by TV Globo that premiered on 25 September 2018, replacing Orgulho e Paixão, and ended on 1 April 2019. It is created by Elizabeth Jhin, and directed by Pedro Vasconcelos.

The show features a large ensemble cast headed by; Vitória Strada, João Vicente de Castro, Alinne Moraes, Rafael Cardoso, Irene Ravache, Júlia Lemmertz, Ângelo Antônio, Vera Fischer and Kéfera Buchmann.

Set in both the present time and the 1930s, Espelho da Vida tells the story of Cris Valencia, a budding actress who accompanies her boyfriend to Rosa Branca to make a film based on Julia Castelo, a woman who was mysteriously murdered in the 30s. Cris will also discover she is actually a reincarnation of Julia Castelo. Cris will try to unravel the enigma that befell her in her past life.

Plot
In the town of Rosa Branca, Vicente makes a last request before dying to his wife, Margot: to call back his grandson, the successful filmmaker Alain, so that he realizes a biographical film to tell to the world the story of Julia Castelo, a victim of a crime in the city in the 1930s that left many situations poorly explained. Although he swore he would never return to his hometown after being betrayed ten years earlier by his ex-girlfriend, Isabel, with his cousin Felipe, is willing to fulfill his grandfather's last wish. His girlfriend, the actress Cris Valencia, accompanies him, 
consequently casting her as the protagonist of the production. During her research in preparation of her role, she encounters a mirror in Julia Castelo's house that allows her to time travel to 1930s, when the crime happened. She also discovers that she is the reincarnation of Julia Castelo.

With the help of Margot, Cris has the chance to unravel all the mysteries of the events and find out if Danilo, Julia's boyfriend at the time, was really the murderer or was wrongly accused, since the lack of documentation and evidence left everything to be just a matter of speculation. The biggest drawback in the life of Alain and Cris is Isabel, willing to do everything to regain her ex-lover. In addition, Cris also has to deal with an overly ambitious artistic rival, Mariane, an enterprising actress who wants the protagonist role of the film at all costs, even if it means harming her.

Cast
 Vitória Strada as Cristina "Cris" Muniz Valência / Julia Castelo / Beatriz
 João Vicente de Castro as Alain Dutra / Gustavo Bruno de Luris
 Alinne Moraes as Isabel Ferraz / Isadora "Dora" Monteiro
 Rafael Cardoso as Daniel Marques / Danilo Breton
 Kéfera Buchmann as Mariane Cardoso / Brigite
 Irene Ravache as Margot Dutra / Hildegard Breton
 Júlia Lemmertz as Ana Muniz de Castro / Piedade Castelo
 Ângelo Antônio as Flávio de Castro / Father Luiz
 Felipe Camargo as Américo Valência / Eugênio Castelo
 Patrícya Travassos as Edméia "Grace" Ferraz / Graça Monteiro
 Emiliano Queiroz as André Luiz de Luris
 Reginaldo Faria as Vicente Dutra / Augusto Breton
 Patrick Sampaio as Felipe Dutra / Otávio de Luris
 Letícia Persiles as Dr. Letícia Oliveira / Maristela Jardim
 Robson Nunes as Afrânio "Bola" Nunes / Benjamin
 Rômulo Neto as Mauro César Pereira
 Thati Lopes as Josiane "Josi" Diniz
 Luciana Paes as Lenita Marques / Milena "Mimi" Trindade
 Nikolas Antunes as Marcelo Vendrini / Lucas
 Suzana Faini as The Old Lady / Albertina Castelo
 Ana Lúcia Torre as Gentileza "Gentil" Marques / Mother Joana
 Vera Fischer as Maria do Carmo Vilela / Gertrude Trindade
 Evandro Mesquita as Emiliano Freitas
 Luciana Vendramini as Solange Sollari
 Guilherme Hamacek as Vitor Valência
 Marcelo Laham as Tadeu Tavares
 Flávia Garrafa as Neusa Tavares
 Renata Tobelem as Daniela "Dani" Simão
 Cadu Libonati as Hugo Leitão
 Anna Rita Cerqueira as Gabriela "Gabi" Dias
 Débora Ozório as Patrícia "Pat" Vendrini Marques
 Catarina Carvalho as Michelle Aparecida Tavares
 Pedroca Monteiro as Cláudio
 Márcio Machado as Sérgio
 Maria Mônica Passos as Maria José "Zezé" Leitão / Sister Zélia
 Andrea Dantas as Abigail Leitão / Sister Dolores 
 Marcelo Escorel as Dr. Dalton Teixeira / Dr. Fabrício
 Cosme dos Santos as Gerson dos Anjos
 Andrea Bacellar as Dalva / Firmina
 Dandara Albuquerque as Sheila dos Anjos
 Luciana Malcher as Débora Martins / Bendita
 Miguel Coelho as Jorge Benício
 Ana Rios as Marina Montez
 Rosana Dias as Valdete / Celine
 Wal Schneider as Martim / Hakima
 José Santa Cruz as Father Léo
 Clara Galinari as Priscila Ferraz Dutra / Teresa Monteiro
 Otávio Martins as Jadson Valência / Henrique Castelo
 Maria Luiza Galhano as Flor Maria dos Anjos

Guest cast
 Carla Diaz as Carine de Sá / Gisela "Gigi" de Castro
 Marcos Junqueira as Kikito
 Haroun Abud as young André
 Ingrid Guimarães as herself
 José Loreto as himself
 Juliana Paes as herself
 Marcelo Faria as himself

Production

Development
The first title to be considered for production was O Avesso da Vida. For the setting of the telenovela, the fictitious Rosa Branca, the network decided not to build a scenic city, but to record in four historic cities of Minas Gerais: Carrancas, Tiradentes, Ouro Preto and Mariana. The first phase of filming ended on 27 July 2018. The first teaser was released on 25 August 2018.

Casting
Isis Valverde was the first to be considered for the lead role, but she passed on the role due to her pregnancy. Paolla Oliveira was cast in the sequence, but the actress repeat partnership with Rafael Cardoso and Alinne Moraes in Além do Tempo, she eventually moved to Troia; Sophie Charlotte, Bianca Bin and Camila Queiroz were also considered for the role, but the part was eventually given to Vitória Strada. After starring in a number of films, Kéfera Buchmann auditioned and was cast, making her debut in television.

Alexandre Nero and Gabriel Leone were also considered for the roles of Alain and Danilo, but for already being on the air in the main roles of the series Onde Nascem os Fortes. They were replaced by João Vicente de Castro and Rafael Cardoso respectively.

Soundtrack

Espelho da Vida: Volume 1

Espelho da Vida: Volume 1 was released on 5 October 2018 by Som Livre. It contains a variety of tracks by various artists.

Espelho da Vida: Volume 2

Espelho da Vida: Volume 2 was released on 7 December 2018 by Som Livre.

Ratings

The premiere registered a viewership rating of 21 points, the same indices recorded by its predecessor, Orgulho e Paixão.

Notes

References

External links
  
 

2018 Brazilian television series debuts
Brazilian telenovelas
TV Globo telenovelas
2018 telenovelas
Television shows about reincarnation
Portuguese-language telenovelas
2019 Brazilian television series endings
Telenovelas about spiritism